Melle Kiet Stomp (born 30 September 1999), better known by his stage name Mesto, is a Dutch electronic musician, record producer, remixer and DJ. He gained recognition after collaborating with Martin Garrix (born in the same town of Amstelveen) on their single "WIEE".

Biography

Early life
Stomp was born on 30 September 1999 in Amstelveen, Netherlands. When he was 6, he started playing the violin. By the age of 11, he began playing the drums and shortly thereafter became interested in making music. He also developed an interest in deep house and future house when he heard "Gecko" by Oliver Heldens and taught himself how to do it by learning it from YouTube. At the age of 14, he became inspired when he 'touched' a DJ set for the first time, prompting him to download specialist software, FL Studio, and enabling him to start composing. He started making deep house music at that same age, but moved to slightly harder house, as well as future house. He studied at Herman Brood Academy, a production school in Utrecht where Martin Garrix and Julian Jordan also went to.

Music career
Mesto began his career in 2014, when he was only 15 years old and his first official release was the single "GO!", a collaboration with Alex Ranzino which was released as a free download on 10 November 2014. Shortly afterwards, he released a remix with Benfield of "Rude", a single by Magic!. He then collaborated with Mike Williams to release a bootleg of "Raise Your Hands" by Ummet Ozcan.

2015: New York & Tokyo

He started 2015 by releasing a single titled "New York". It was followed by his third single "Tokyo" in February. In April, he released a bootleg of "Lean On" by Major Lazer and DJ Snake featuring MØ in April. The single "Rio" was released in May before the bootleg of "Satisfied" by Showtek featuring Vassy in September. Mesto's single "Tetris (Truffle Butter Mashup)" was released as a free download on 9 December 2015. He was featured in production alongside Justin Mylo in Martin Garrix's single "Bouncybob", which was released as a free download on 31 December 2015.

2016: WIEE

On 6 January 2016 Mesto performed alongside Martin Garrix and Justin Mylo at Bij Igmar on SLAM!. In April, he remixed "Me, Myself & I" by G-Eazy and Bebe Rexha, officially released on 26 April. The remix was followed by the bootleg of "Another You" by Armin van Buuren featuring Mr. Probz in that same month and the remix of "We're Guna Fight Em Off" by Ill Phil in June. In July, he and Justin Mylo remixed "Final Call", a single by Florian Picasso for the Remixes EP, officially released on 8 July. On 10 October 2016 it was announced that Mesto signed a contract with Spinnin' Records. That same month, he released "Wiee", a collaboration with Martin Garrix on Stmpd Rcrds. The single was played by Garrix as an ID at Home Festival in Treviso, Italy in early September, and was a part of his seven-track extended play Seven. He also performed at the Amsterdam Dance Event for the first time. On 16 December 2016 he released a remix of "Alone" by NERVO and Askery featuring Brielle Von Hugel, which was his first release on Spinnin' Records. A day later, he was a guest and performed at Midden In Je Weekend Show on SLAM!. He then performed at Mezz in Breda during the "3FM Clubhuis presents" and "DJs for 3FM Serious Request".

2017-Present: Chatterbox

On 16 January 2017 Mesto released "Chatterbox", a collaboration with Fox Stevenson through Spinnin' Records. Shortly afterwards, he revealed "Step Up Your Game", his drum and bass debut single on Spinnin' Premium. The single was available as a free download on Spinnin' Records website until 17 March, after that date it was released on iTunes, Beatport and Spotify. He then released a remix for "Not Going Home", a single by DVBBS and CMC$ featuring Gia Koka. On 10 April 2017 he collaborated with Curbi on "Bruh", which would be his first release through Tiësto's label Musical Freedom. On 10 July 2017 Mesto released the single "Chances", featuring Brielle Von Hugel. An official music video for the song was released.

Discography

Charting singles

Singles

 2014: "Go!" (with Andy Grammer) [Free download]
 2015: "New York" [Free download]
 2015: "Tokyo" [Free download]
 2015: "Rio" [Free download]
 2015: "Bouncybob" (Martin Garrix featuring Justin Mylo and Mesto) [Free download]
 2016: "Wiee" (with Martin Garrix) [Stmpd Rcrds]
 2017: "Chatterbox" (with Fox Stevenson) [Spinnin' Records]
 2017: "Step Up Your Game" [Spinnin' Premium]
 2017: "Bruh" (with Curbi) [Musical Freedom (Spinnin')]
 2017: "Chances" (featuring Brielle Von Hugel) [Spinnin' Records]
 2018: "Coming Home" (with Tiësto) [Musical Freedom (Spinnin')]
 2018: "Save Me" (with Jay Hardway) [Spinnin' Records]
 2018: "Give Me Love" [Musical Freedom (Spinnin')]
 2018: "Missing You" [Spinnin' Records]
 2018: "Too Much" (with Ashley Miller) [Spinnin' Records]
 2019: "Leyla" [Spinnin' Records]
 2019: "Can't Get Enough" (with Tiësto) [Musical Freedom (Spinnin')]
 2019: "Back & Forth" [Spinnin' Records]
 2019: "The Good Life" (with Ashley Miller) [Musical Freedom (Spinnin')]
 2019: "Never Alone" (with Felix Jaehn featuring Vcation) [Virgin]
 2019: "Don't Worry" (featuring Aloe Blacc) [Spinnin' Records]
2020: "The Amazing Race" (with Oliver Heldens) [Heldeep (Spinnin')]
 2020: "Long Time" (with Brooks) [Spinnin' Records]
 2020: "Looking Back" [Spinnin' Records]
 2021: "Don't Wait" (with Dastic featuring Claudy) [Spinnin' Records]
 2022: "Limitless" (with Martin Garrix) [STMP RCRDS]
 2022: "Where Do We Go" (with Vluarr) [Spinnin' Records]
 2022: "Better Days" (feat. Aloe Blacc) [Spinnin' Records]
 2023: "Bring It Back" [Spinnin' Records]

Production and songwriting credits
 2018: Throttle - "Like This"
 2019: Throttle - "Japan"
 2020: Mike Williams and Justin Mylo featuring Mary Reynolds - "From You"

Remixes

 2014: Magic! - "Rude" (Mesto and Benfield Remix)
 2014: Ummet Ozcan - "Raise Your Hands" (Mike Williams and Mesto Future Bootleg) [Spinnin' Records]
 2015: Major Lazer and DJ Snake featuring MØ - "Lean On" (Mesto Future Bootleg) [Mad Decent]
 2015: Showtek featuring Vassy - "Satisfied" (Mesto Future Bootleg) [Skink]
 2016: G-Eazy and Bebe Rexha - "Me, Myself & I" (Mesto Remix) [RCA Records]
 2016: Armin van Buuren featuring Mr. Probz - "Another You" (Mesto Bootleg) [Armada Music]
 2016: Future - "Stick Talk" (Mesto Remix) [Free Download]
 2016: Florian Picasso - "Final Call" (Mesto and Justin Mylo Remix) [Protocol Recordings]
 2016: NERVO and Mary Reynolds featuring Brielle Von Hugel - "Alone" (Mesto Remix) [Spinnin' Records]
 2017: DVBBS and CMC$ featuring Kelsea Ballerini - "Not Going Home" (Mesto Remix) [Free Download]
 2017: David Guetta and Afrojack featuring Charli XCX and French Montana - "Dirty Sexy Money" (Mesto Remix) [What A Music]
 2018: Sam Feldt and Cameron Boyce featuring Johnny Test - "Just Dropped In" (Mesto Remix) [Spinnin' Remixes]
 2018: The Chainsmokers - "You Owe Me" (Mesto Remix) [Disruptor, Columbia]
 2018: Kungs and StarGate - "Be Right Here" (featuring Lil Pump) (Mesto Remix) [Universal Music Division Barclay]
 2019: Shawn Mendes - "If I Can't Have You" (Mesto Remix) [Republic Records]
 2020: Youngboy Never Broke Again - "Kacey Talk" (Mesto Remix) [Spinnin' Records]
 2021: Mike Williams and Felix Jaehn - "Without You" (Mesto Remix) [Universal Music]

Notes
 A  "Bouncybob" did not enter the Singles Top 100, but peaked at number 16 on the Single Tip chart.
 B  "Bouncybob" did not enter the Ultratop 50, but peaked at number 7 on the Walloon Dance Bubbling Under chart.
 C  "Wiee" did not enter the Ultratop 50, but peaked at number 24 on the Single Tip chart.
 D  "Wiee" did not enter the Ultratop 50, but peaked on the Flemish Ultratip chart.
 E  "Wiee" did not enter the Ultratop 50, but peaked at number 15 on the Walloon Dance Bubbling Under chart.
 F  "Chatterbox" did not enter the Ultratop 50, but peaked on the Flemish Ultratip chart.
 G  "Chatterbox" did not enter the Ultratop 50, but peaked at number 17 on the Walloon Dance Bubbling Under chart.
 H  "Bruh" did not enter the Ultratop 50, but peaked at number 17 on the Flemish Dance Bubbling Under chart.

References

External links
 

1999 births
Dutch dance musicians
Dutch DJs
Dutch record producers
Living people
People from Amstelveen
Spinnin' Records artists
Electro house musicians
Future bass musicians
Future house musicians
Deep house musicians
Progressive house musicians
Remixers
Electronic dance music DJs
FL Studio users